Simone Sales (born 31 January 1988) is an Italian footballer who plays for Team Altamura.

Biography
Born in Sanarica, the Province of Lecce, Apulia, Sales started his career at Lombard club Atalanta. Sales was the member of the under-18 team in 2005–06 season. Sales was promoted to under-19 team in 2006–07 season.

In July 2007 Sales joined Cuoio Pelli – Cappiano Romaiano in co-ownership deal. Sales earned a call-up to Italy under-20 Serie C team in September 2008; he represent Group B of Lega Pro 2nd Division in Lega Pro Quadrangular Tournament in January 2009.

In June 2009 Atalanta bought him back, and re-sold Sales to another Lombard club Cremonese in another co-ownership deal for €7,500. In June 2011 Atalanta gave up the remain 50% registration rights for free. Cremonese extended the contract of Sales and Mauro Minelli on 3 July 2013.

On 2 September 2013 Sales went back to hometown club Lecce in a temporary deal, with Carmine Palumbo moved to opposite direction.

On 30 July 2020 he moved to Monopoli on a 2-year contract.

On 12 January 2021 he signed a 1.5-year contract with Catania.

On 27 August 2021 he moved to Team Altamura in Serie D.

Footnotes

References

External links
 AIC profile (data by football.it) 
 

1988 births
Sportspeople from the Province of Lecce
Footballers from Apulia
Living people
Italian footballers
Association football defenders
Atalanta B.C. players
U.S. Cremonese players
U.S. Lecce players
Venezia F.C. players
Carrarese Calcio players
S.S. Teramo Calcio players
Potenza Calcio players
S.S. Monopoli 1966 players
Catania S.S.D. players
Serie C players
Serie D players
21st-century Italian people